Guigues IV may refer to:
Guigues IV of Albon
Guigues IV of Forez